Nikolaos Kontopoulos (Greek: Νικόλαος Κοντόπουλος, 1889–1958) was a Greek writer.

He was born in the village of Lousika in Achaea, Greece.  He studied in Athens and later studied as a student and as a professor at the polytechnical school. He wrote many books.

References
The first version of the article is translated and is based from the article at the Greek Wikipedia (el:Main Page)

1889 births
1958 deaths
Greek writers
People from Achaea